Dust is the debut studio album by American music producer and Cypress Hill member DJ Muggs, credited as Muggs. The album was released by ANTI- on March 11, 2003. A stylistic departure from his previous work, Dust saw Muggs exploring a sound rooted in trip hop and electronica. The album features vocals by Josh Todd of Buckcherry, Greg Dulli of The Afghan Whigs and The Twilight Singers, Amy Trujillo, and Everlast.

Dust was re-released by ANTI-'s sister label Epitaph Records on May 8, 2007.

Singles 
"Rain" and "Morta" were the album's first singles, being released before any other songs on the album through either download sites such as CNet's "music.download.com" or compilation albums such as "Anti-spring." (ANTI- Records, 2003)

Track listing 

Notes
 Track 9 is a cover song of "Fat City (Slight Return)" by The Twilight Singers (2003)
 Track 11 contents elements of "The Sorcerer Of Isis (The Ritual Of The Mole)" by Power Of Zeus (1970)

Personnel 
 Lawrence Muggerud – guitar, drums, keyboards, programming, drum programming
 Amy Trujillo – vocals
 Erik Francis Schrody – vocals
 Greg Dulli – vocals
 Joshua Todd Gruber – vocals
 Mike Sims – bass, guitar
 Paula Gallitano – strings
 Reggie Stewart – bass, guitar, piano
 Scott Ables – drums
 Rob Hill – mixing
 Brian Gardner – mastering
 Estevan Oriol – design
 Mark Machado – design
 Sonny Gerasimowicz – design
 Stephanie Chao – photography

Charts

References

External links

2003 albums
DJ Muggs albums
Albums produced by DJ Muggs
Anti- (record label) albums